"Reet Petite (The Sweetest Girl in Town)" (originally subtitled "The Finest Girl You Ever Want to Meet") is a song written by Berry Gordy, Billy Davis, and Gwen Gordy Fuqua, and made popular by Jackie Wilson. It was his first solo hit after leaving the Dominoes and, over the years, has become one of his biggest international chart successes. It was the UK Christmas number one in 1986, almost three years after Wilson's death.

History
The song was written by Berry Gordy, Gwen Gordy Fuqua, and Wilson's cousin Roquel "Billy" Davis (though credited under his pseudonym Tyran Carlo on the record) and produced by Dick Jacobs, and its title was taken from the Louis Jordan song "Reet, Petite and Gone". It was Jackie Wilson's first recording as a solo artist. The song peaked at number 62 on the Billboard Hot 100 in September 1957 and reached number 6 on the UK Singles Chart.  With the success of the song, Gordy was able to fund the launch of Motown Records.

The song was reissued in 1986 following the showing of a clay animation video on the BBC Two documentary series Arena. The video was directed by Giblets, a London-based animation studio. The reissued version proved so popular that in December 1986, almost three years after Wilson's death, the song became a number 1 in the UK for four weeks (selling over 700,000 copies) becoming that year's Christmas number 1, 29 years after its chart debut.

Track lists

Charts

Year-end charts

Cover versions
 The song was covered in September 1964 by Dinah Lee and reached the number 1 position in New Zealand and a number 6 position in Melbourne (Australia did not have a national chart at that time).

See also
List of posthumous number-one singles (UK)

References

1957 singles
1986 singles
Jackie Wilson songs
Dutch Top 40 number-one singles
Irish Singles Chart number-one singles
UK Singles Chart number-one singles
Songs written by Berry Gordy
Songs written by Billy Davis (songwriter)
1957 songs
Brunswick Records singles
Christmas number-one singles in the United Kingdom